Tetraspanin-8 is a protein that in humans is encoded by the TSPAN8 gene.

Function 

The protein encoded by this gene is a member of the transmembrane 4 superfamily, also known as the tetraspanin family. Most of these members are cell-surface proteins that are characterized by the presence of four hydrophobic domains. The proteins mediate signal transduction events that play a role in the regulation of cell development, activation, growth and motility. This encoded protein is a cell surface glycoprotein that is known to complex with integrins. This gene is expressed in different carcinomas. The use of alternate polyadenylation sites has been found for this gene.

Clinical significance 

Overall survival of ovarian cancer patients was effectively predicted by TSPAN8.

References

Further reading